Kirovsky is a rural locality (a settlement) and the administrative center of Kirovsky Selsoviet, Topchikhinsky District, Altai Krai, Russia. The population was 1,034 as of 2013. There are 8 streets.

Geography 
Kirovsky is located 39 km south of Topchikha (the district's administrative centre) by road. Sadovy is the nearest rural locality.

References 

Rural localities in Topchikhinsky District